Michael William Masser (March 24, 1941 – July 9, 2015) was an American songwriter, composer and producer of popular music.

Early life
Born to a Jewish family in Chicago to Ester Huff and William Masser, he attended the University of Illinois College of Law. He became a stockbroker, but left to pursue his interest in music.

Career
Masser's first major composition hit, co-written with Ron Miller, was "Touch Me in the Morning", recorded by Diana Ross.  He co-wrote several other hit songs in the 1970s and 1980s, including four made famous by Whitney Houston, "Didn't We Almost Have It All", "Saving All My Love for You", "All at Once" and "Greatest Love of All", originally recorded as "The Greatest Love of All"  by George Benson for the 1977 film The Greatest. Other Masser's songs by Benson are "In Your Eyes" (George Benson, Jeffrey Osborne), "Nothing's Gonna Change My Love for You" (George Benson, Glenn Medeiros) and "You Are the Love of My Life" (George Benson and Roberta Flack).  His hit songs by other artists include "Hold Me" (Teddy Pendergrass and Whitney Houston), "Tonight, I Celebrate My Love" (Roberta Flack and Peabo Bryson), "If Ever You're in My Arms Again" (Peabo Bryson), "Miss You Like Crazy" (Natalie Cole) and "Someone That I Used To Love" (Natalie Cole), "So Sad the Song" (Teddy Pendergrass, Gladys Knight), and "It's My Turn" and "Last Time I Saw Him" (Diana Ross). A country cover of "Last Time I Saw Him" by Dottie West also became a hit, peaking at #8 on the country charts. Masser was nominated for an Academy Award in 1976 for Best Music, Original Song, for "Theme from Mahogany (Do You Know Where You're Going To)," which he wrote with Gerry Goffin.  The song had actually been first recorded (also in 1975) by fellow Motown labelmate Thelma Houston as a planned single but was pulled before release.  Diana Ross' version was released as the theme song for her 1975 film, Mahogany.  Among the many recordings that Masser produced are Barbra Streisand's "Someone That I Used to Love" (originally a hit for Natalie Cole) and the duet by Judy Collins and T. G. Sheppard, "Home Again".  Over the course of his career, more than 110 recordings of his songs were released.

In 2002, a Golden Palm Star on the Palm Springs, California, Walk of Stars was dedicated to him. Masser was inducted into the Songwriters Hall of Fame in 2007.

Personal life
Masser and his wife, the former Ogniana Drandiyska, lived in Rancho Mirage, California.

On July 9, 2015, Masser died at the age of 74 at his home in Rancho Mirage.

Compositions

References

External links

Michael Masser at Find a Grave

1941 births
2015 deaths
American male composers
Record producers from Illinois
University of Illinois College of Law alumni
Stockbrokers
Businesspeople from Chicago
Songwriters from Illinois
American composers
American male songwriters
Jewish American songwriters
Burials at Mount Sinai Memorial Park Cemetery
20th-century American businesspeople
21st-century American Jews